Engraulicypris howesi is a species of cyprinid in the genus Engraulicypris. It inhabits the Kunene River in Angola and Namibia and has a maximum length of 4.3 cm (1.7 inches).

References

Cyprinidae
Cyprinid fish of Africa
Fish of Angola
Fish of Namibia